Finncon is the largest science fiction convention in Finland and, with up to 15,000 participants, one of the largest SF conventions in Europe. Finncon is unique among SF conventions because it has no participation/membership fee, and is funded primarily on various cultural grants as well as income from traders. The event is organised annually in different cities in Finland.

From 2003 to 2009 and in 2011 the convention included the anime convention Animecon, which boosted the convention's attendance and public visibility significantly. Since then the conventions have separated, and the future of the Finnish Animecon is currently uncertain beyond the 2011 combined Finncon-Animecon.

Finncon alternates between different cities in Finland without a formal rota. Recently the event has been held almost every year, but occasionally a year is skipped if no city is found to host the event that year.

Finncons

External links 

 Finncon website
 Finncon 2018

Multigenre conventions
Science fiction conventions in Europe
Entertainment events in Finland
Recurring events established in 1986
1986 establishments in Finland
Annual events in Finland